Uzkiano is a little village which belongs to the Municipality of Urkabustaiz in the province of Álava, Basque Country.

Geography 
The village belongs to the region of Zuia. It is locatedin the valley of the Altube river, which is a flowing of the Nervion river, by its right side.
The near villages are, Oiardo, Unzá-Apreguindana, Gujuli and Izarra.

Sports 
The most famous in the village is 'Bolo alaves', which is only played in the province of Álava. The local team has won four-non-stop times the 'Torneo Urkabustaiz', from 2005 to 2008. Then between 2011 and 2013, the team won again that competition.
In the last years, the team arrived on several times to the final in different competitions of the hole province.

Populated places in Álava